Roderick Lewis Macdonald (born 1 January 1957) is a Scottish politician who was a Member of the Scottish Parliament (MSP) for the North East Scotland region between 2011 and 2021. A member of Scottish Labour, he previously represented the Aberdeen Central constituency from 1999 to 2011. He was a deputy Scottish Executive minister from 2001 to 2007.

Early life and career
Born in Stornoway, Macdonald moved with his family to Aberdeenshire as a child, and attended Inverurie Academy and later the University of Aberdeen. Macdonald received an MA in history and a PhD in African studies and later lectured at the university. He is a member of the trade union Unite.

Political career
Macdonald unsuccessfully contested the Moray UK Parliament constituency at the 1997 general election. Prior to his election as an MSP, he worked as a parliamentary researcher to the MPs Frank Doran and Tom Clarke. After being elected in the 1999 Scottish Parliament election, Macdonald joined the Scottish Executive in March 2001. He was briefly Deputy Minister for Transport and Planning from March to November 2001. He then served as Deputy Minister for Enterprise, Transport and Lifelong Learning, later renamed Deputy Minister for Enterprise and Lifelong Learning, from 2001 to 2004. He served as Deputy Minister for Environment and Rural Development from 2004 to 2005 and Deputy Minister for Health and Community Care from 2005 to 2007.

Between June 2013 and December 2014, Macdonald served as Scottish Labour Chief Whip. He has also led for Scottish Labour on enterprise and tourism, infrastructure, justice and energy. He has served as convener of the Health and Sport Committee from December 2017 to May 2021. He became interim Deputy Presiding Officer of the Scottish Parliament in April 2020, following the self isolation of Christine Grahame during the COVID-19 pandemic.

Macdonald nominated Anas Sarwar in the 2021 Scottish Labour leadership election. He stood down at the 2021 Scottish Parliament election.

Personal life 
Macdonald is married to Sandra who has worked in the oil industry. Macdonald also has two children. Sandra has been elected as a member on Aberdeen City Council.

References

External links
 
Lewis Macdonald MSP personal site

1957 births
Living people
People from Stornoway
People from Inverurie
People educated at Inverurie Academy
Alumni of the University of Aberdeen
Academics of the University of Aberdeen
Labour MSPs
Scottish trade unionists
Members of the Scottish Parliament for Aberdeen constituencies
Members of the Scottish Parliament 1999–2003
Members of the Scottish Parliament 2003–2007
Members of the Scottish Parliament 2007–2011
Members of the Scottish Parliament 2011–2016
Members of the Scottish Parliament 2016–2021
Deputy Presiding Officers of the Scottish Parliament